The Autovía A-63 is a highway in Asturias, Spain. Once completed, it will connect the provincial capital, Oviedo, with La Espina; currently it only connects Oviedo and Cornellana, with half of the carriageway built from Salas to La Espina. It follows the N-634. The possibility of adding a section to Canero, which would connect the road to the A-8, is currently being studied.

Sections

References 

A-63
A-63